James Salter was an American writer.

James Salter may also refer to:

James Arthur Salter, 1st Baron Salter (1881–1975), British politician and academic
James Salter (swimmer) (born 1976), British swimmer

See also
Jamie Salter (disambiguation)